Pogudino is a rural locality (a village) in Kichmegnskoye Rural Settlement, Kichmengsko-Gorodetsky District, Vologda Oblast, Russia. The population was 19 as of 2002.

Geography 
Pogudino is located 21 km northeast of Kichmengsky Gorodok (the district's administrative centre) by road. Lychenitsa is the nearest rural locality.

References 

Rural localities in Kichmengsko-Gorodetsky District